Katamarayudu is a 2017 Indian Telugu-language action drama film directed by Kishore Kumar Pardasani. It stars Pawan Kalyan and Shruti Haasan while Tarun Arora, Siva Balaji, Ajay, Ali, Kamal Kamaraju, Chaitanya Krishna, Pradeep Rawat, Rao Ramesh, and Nassar appear in supporting roles. It is a remake of Tamil film Veeram, which was directed by Siva.

The music was composed by Anup Rubens with cinematography by Prasad Murella and editing by Gautham Raju. The film released worldwide on 24 March 2017.It's Hindi dubbed version released by Goldmines Telefilms and the film was also dubbed in Malayalam under the same title. The movie was a disaster at the box office.

Plot 
Kattula Katamarayudu "Katama" is a brave person living in a village called Oddaanchatram. He lives with his four brothers. The elder brother loves the younger ones to the core and sacrifices his happiness for their good. They are often caught in fights and are proud of it. Advocate Bail Lingam bails them out whenever legal issues arise because of their brawls. Katamarayudu hates the idea of marriage as he feels that his wife might create disharmony among brothers. Though the four younger brothers say that they do not want to either fall in love or get married, when Katama is not around, they all have their secret lovers. To get the  approval of their love stories, they learn through his brother's childhood friend Collector that Katama, when in school, was in love with a girl named Avantika, and his brothers hatch a plan to find her and reintroduce her to  Katama so that he may fall for her all over again. However, she is married now and has kids, so the brothers hatch  to find another woman named Avantika because Katama was not in love with that girl so much as her name, and when he meets another (completely random) girl with that name, he is sure to lose his heart to her just because she bears that name. Though initially reluctant, later  Katama  falls in love with her. He clashes with a businessman called Radia to take care of the market in the village. Radia tries to kill  Katama's brothers, while Katama kidnaps Radia's son Juttu Ranga. After clashing, Kattula Katamarayudu orders Radia to leave the village.

While travelling in the train to Avantika's village, Avantika narrates her family background to  Katama. Avanthika's father Bhupathi is a respected man in the village who hates violence, while his son is the exact opposite who kills people, but when he is killed, Bhupathi refuses to bury his body and decides to make his village with peace and harmony. A few goons enter into the train, but Katama bashes all the rowdies. Avantika is shocked as she thought he was a non-violence person. Katamar and his brothers arrive at Avantika's village with clean shaven looks. He says that he has changed and would never harbor violence, and he and his brothers are welcomed and respected by her family. Bhupathi is touched and impressed by their love, affection, and hospitality.  Katama learns that a goon named Yelasari Bhanu wants to kill Bhupathi and his family. The reason is revealed through a flashback: Yelasari Bhanu's father is responsible for the blast of a matchstick factory. Bhupathi complains against Yelasari Bhanu's father and is arrested, and the father commits suicide by getting hit by a lorry.

Yelasari Bhanu swears revenge against Bhupathi. Katama finishes all the goons and solves all their problems without the knowledge of Bhupathi and the family. When Bhupathi's granddaughter finds a sickle under Katama's jeep, Bhupathi orders Katama to go out of town. Yelasari Bhanu, who escapes from the death sentence, arrives to kill Bhupathi, but  Katama keeps him and his family in a safe place. Yelasari Bhanu informs  Katamarayudu that he had kidnapped one of his brothers, Sivarayudu.  Katama arrives at the nick of time and saves his brother but instead gets attacked by Yelasari Bhanu. Bhupathi and his family, who arrive at the place, come to know about the risk taken by  Katama to save him. An injured  Katamarayudu rises steadily and brutally kills Yelasari Bhanu and his henchmen. Bhupathi, who is impressed with Katamarayudu's valour, decided to give his hand to his daughter Avantika. The film ends with the marriage of Kattula Katamarayudu and his brothers.

Cast

Production 
After the release of his previous film Sardaar Gabbar Singh (2016), Pawan Kalyan announced that he would remake Tamil film Veeram (2014) in Telugu with S. J. Surya as a director, despite the fact that the Tamil film was already dubbed and released in Telugu as Veerudokkade. The title of the film was announced as Katamarayudu named after the song sung by Pawan from the film Attarintiki Daredi (2013). However, in a sudden turn of events, Suryah left the project to concentrate on acting assignments as he was the main villain of the upcoming móvie, Spyder, and he was replaced by Kishore Kumar Pardasani, collaborating with Pawan for the second time after Gopala Gopala (2015) while Soundarrajan, who was the cinematographer, was replaced by Prasad Murella. The film began its shoot on 24 September in Secunderabad.

Soundtrack 

The music was composed by Anup Rubens and released by Aditya Music.

Reception 

Great Andhra in its review called the music as a total letdown and one of the most disappointing works of Anup and probably one of the weak albums in Pawan Kalyan's career, if not the weakest. However, Karthik from Milliblog found it "a simple, likeable commercial album by Anup."

Kathi Mahesh critically reviewed the movie and called it "a badly written film" with "a predictable screenplay". He also said that the movie was sexist and has a lot of derogatory comments against women. Soon after, he was trolled online and cyberbullied with abuses and threats on his Facebook wall, allegedly by Pawan Kalyan's fans.

References

External links 
 

2017 films
2010s Telugu-language films
Indian action comedy films
2010s masala films
Films scored by Anoop Rubens
Telugu remakes of Tamil films
2017 action comedy films